Events from the year 1455 in Ireland.

Incumbent
Lord: Henry VI

Births

 Thaddeus McCarthy, Bishop of Ross (Ireland), then Bishop of Cork and Cloyne (d. 1492)

References